Baylor Scheierman (born September 26, 2000) is an American college basketball player for the Creighton Bluejays of the Big East Conference. He previously played for the South Dakota State Jackrabbits.

High school career
Scheierman attended Aurora High School and played basketball, football, baseball, and golf. He averaged 16 points, six rebounds, and six assists per game as a junior. Scheierman played quarterback and threw for 3,942 yards and a state-record 59 touchdowns as a senior, leading the team to a Class C Championship. On the court, Scheierman averaged 22.1 points, 9.8 rebounds and 6.5 assists per game as a senior, leading the Huskies to the state tournament. In November 2017, he committed to playing college basketball for South Dakota State, stating he liked the family atmosphere.

College career
As a freshman, Scheierman averaged six points, 4.7 rebounds, and 2.2 assists per game, shooting 42.7 percent from the floor. He worked on his outside shooting over the summer. On March 8, 2021, he scored a career-high 28 points in a 90–88 semifinals loss against Oral Roberts after Kevin Obanor made a game-winning shot. Scheierman averaged 15.4 points, 9.2 rebounds and four assists per game as a sophomore, shooting 49.8 percent from the floor. He was named to the First Team All-Summit League. He hit a three-pointer at the buzzer in a 77–74 win against Washington State. Scheierman was named Summit League Player of the Year as a junior. He averaged 16.2 points per game and led the conference in rebounding (7.8 per game) and assists (4.5 per game), shooting 51 percent from the field. Following the season, Scheierman entered the NCAA transfer portal and also declared for the 2022 NBA draft while maintaining his collegiate eligibility. On May 3, 2022, he committed to Creighton while remaining in the NBA Draft. On May 24, 2022, Scheierman withdrew from the NBA draft.

Career statistics

College

|-
| style="text-align:left;"| 2019–20
| style="text-align:left;"| South Dakota State
| 32 || 3 || 20.2 || .427 || .247 || .667 || 4.7 || 2.2 || .4 || .2 || 6.0
|-
| style="text-align:left;"| 2020–21
| style="text-align:left;"| South Dakota State
| 23 || 23 || 35.2 || .498 || .438 || .845 || 9.2 || 4.0 || 1.0 || .2 || 15.4
|- class="sortbottom"
| style="text-align:center;" colspan="2"| Career
| 55 || 26 || 26.5 || .469 || .367 || .773 || 6.6 || 2.9 || .7 || .2 || 9.9

Personal life
Scheierman has two older sisters, a younger sister, and a younger brother. His father Scott played basketball at Hastings College. The younger Scheierman's favorite player is Pete Maravich.

References

External links
South Dakota State Jackrabbits bio

2000 births
Living people
American men's basketball players
Basketball players from Nebraska
Creighton Bluejays men's basketball players
People from Aurora, Nebraska
Shooting guards
South Dakota State Jackrabbits men's basketball players